The Velie Monocoupe was an American general aviation aircraft manufactured from 1927 to 1929 by the Mono-Aircraft Corp, a division of Velie Motors Corporation (founded by Willard L. Velie, maternal grandson of John Deere).

Design and development
The Velie Monocoupe was a wooden framed, doped fabric-covered monoplane, seating two people side-by-side in an enclosed cabin (hence the name).

Conceived by pilot/businessman Don A. Luscombe, who developed a mock-up in 1926, and developed into a flying airplane by farmer-turned-plane-designer Clayton Folkerts—first produced by Central States Aircraft Corp in Davenport, Iowa—the little plane was a revolution in personal aviation:  small, relatively inexpensive, quick and efficient (70-80 mph on just 55 horsepower), and with an enclosed cockpit (protected from the weather) for two people. In an era of big, costly, lumbering, open-cockpit biplanes, the Monocoupe was like a flying sports car coupe.

In all there were 350 Velie Monocoupes produced under the approved type certificate number 22. Upon W. L. Velie's death, his son had planned to continue production of the aircraft but he died within months of his father. The company, and design, survived, however.

Company change
Upon the death of Velie's founder, in 1929 the Mono Aircraft Division was transferred to the holding company Allied Aircraft Co., which split the airplane division into Mono Aircraft Co. and Lambert Motors Co.  Mono Aircraft would continue to produce the Monocoupe, in various versions—ultimately changing its name to Monocoupe Corp. The company producing the Monocoupe line changed ownership and location several times from 1926 to the early 1950s.

Surviving aircraft

 31 – Model 70 airworthy with the Kelch Aviation Museum in Brodhead, Wisconsin.
 85 – Model 70 on static display at the Quad Cities International Airport in Moline, Illinois. It was flown in 1928 by female aviation pioneer Phoebe Omlie to set an altitude record at the airport.
 132 – Model 70 airworthy with Kenneth R. Hetge of Tehachapi, California
 133 – Model 70 on static display at the California Science Center in Los Angeles, California. It is on loan from the National Air and Space Museum.
 134 – Model 70 airworthy at the Golden Age Air Museum in Bethel, Pennsylvania.
 151 – Model 70 on static display at the Hiller Aviation Museum in San Carlos, California.
 156 – Model 70 airworthy at the Western Antique Aeroplane & Automobile Museum in Hood River, Oregon.
 247 – Model 113 on static display at the EAA Aviation Museum in Oshkosh, Wisconsin.
 248 – Model 113 airworthy with Robert J. Coolbaugh of New Market, Virginia.
 304 – Model 113 airworthy with Walter C. Bowe of Sonoma, California.
 322 – Model 113 (original registration NC8955) under restoration to airworthiness at the Old Rhinebeck Aerodrome in Red Hook, New York.

Specifications (Monocoupe Model 70)

See also
 Monocoupe Aircraft
 Monocoupe Model 22
 Monocoupe 70

Notes

External links
 Old Rhinebeck Aerodrome's Golden Age aircraft listing on their NC8955 Model 113 Monocoupe
 Davisson, Budd, "The Mighty Monocoupe: Big Legend in a Small Package, from the “Peanut Pireps” section, at author's Airbum.com website
 Early Birds Foundation, "Velie 'Monocoupe,'", Early Birds Foundation

1920s United States civil utility aircraft
High-wing aircraft
Single-engined tractor aircraft
Aircraft first flown in 1928
Manufacturers based in Grantville, Pennsylvania